Sammy Davis Jr. at Town Hall is a 1959 live album by Sammy Davis Jr., recorded at The Town Hall in Manhattan.

Track listing
 "Something's Gotta Give" (Johnny Mercer) – 1:35
 "And This Is My Beloved" (Robert Wright, George Forrest) – 2:20
 "Hey There" (Richard Adler, Jerry Ross) – 2:00
 "My Funny Valentine" (Richard Rodgers, Lorenz Hart) – 2:06
 "It's All Right with Me" (Cole Porter) – 5:40
 "But Not For Me" (George Gershwin, Ira Gershwin) – 3:10
 "Ethel, Baby" (Jerry Bock, Larry Holofcener, George David Weiss) – 2:00
 "Too Close for Comfort" (Jerry Bock, Larry Holofcener, Weiss) – 1:20
 "My Heart Is So Full Of You" (Frank Loesser) – 3:22
 "Ol' Man River" (Jerome Kern, Oscar Hammerstein II) – 3:37
 "Chicago" (Fred Fisher) – 1:45
 "How High the Moon" (Nancy Hamilton, Morgan Lewis) - 5:04
 Impersonations: "Nature Boy"/"Because of You" (eden ahbez/Arthur Hammerstein, Dudley Wilkinson) – 3:43

Personnel 
 Sammy Davis Jr. – vocals
 Morty Stevens – arranger, conductor

References

Sammy Davis Jr. live albums
1959 live albums
Decca Records live albums
Albums recorded at the Town Hall